Area code 763 is the telephone numbering plan code for the northwestern suburbs of Minneapolis-St. Paul, Minnesota, including cities such as Plymouth, Maple Grove, and Brooklyn Park. It was created in 2000 along with area code 952 (southwest suburbs) when they were carved out of area code 612, which now only contains the city of Minneapolis and a few inner-ring locales.

The area code splits in the Twin Cities are unusual - they split along municipal, rather than central office, boundaries. A sizeable number of exchanges are thus divided between two area codes, and a few are divided among three. 

763 is bordered on the north and west by area code 320, on the east by area code 651, and by area codes 952 and 612 to the south and southeast respectively.

Despite the Twin Cities' rapid growth, 763 is nowhere near exhaustion. The latest NANPA projections do not include an exhaust date for 763. 

Even with the split into four area codes, most of the Twin Cities region is still a single rate center. The four Twin Cities area codes comprise one of the largest local calling areas in the United States; with a few exceptions, no long-distance charges are applied from one part of the Twin Cities to another.  Portions of area codes 320 and 507 are local calls from the Twin Cities as well.

Cities and Communities within

See also
 List of North American area codes

External links
NANPA: Minnesota area code map
 List of exchanges from AreaCodeDownload.com, 763 Area Code

References

763
763
2000 establishments in Minnesota